Rudolf Johannes van Niekerk (known as Dolf) ( — ) was a South African author, dramatist, radio presenter and professor. He writes in Afrikaans and was a member of the Sestigers group.

Education
van Niekerk was born in Edenburg and matriculated at the Edenburg High School. In 1949 he was awarded a Bachelor of Arts degree by the University College of the Orange Free State in Bloemfontein, and in 1950 an honours degree in Philosophy at the University of South Africa (Unisa).

In 1967, he was awarded a Master of Arts degree by the University of Pretoria. In 1978, he became an Emeritus Professor of the University of Pretoria, a position he held until his retirement in 1994.

Career 
In 1950 he became a radio presenter and producer. In 1957, he became the head of the radio department for the Department of Agriculture, and later the Head of Radio for the whole broadcasting network.

van Niekerk's first work, a book of poems, Standpunte, was published in 1953. He also was writing prose and radio plays and writing for television. His novel Gannavlei was published in 1958. He was awarded the Eugène-Marais Prize in 1963, for his collection of short stories.

In 1986, he was awarded the MER Prize, and the Scheepers Award for Youth Literature, for the novel Die Haasvanger.

Works

Prose
 Gannavlei: novel, Dagbreek-Boekhandel, 1958
 Die son struikel, Dagbreek-Boekhandel, 1960
 Skepsels, Afrikaanse Pers Boekhandel, 1963
 Die moeder, Nasionale Boekhandel, 1965
 Woord in die môre, Perskor, 1978
 Kort lewe van 'n reisiger, Tafelberg, 1979
  'n Bietjie luisterkuier, Folio, 1983
 Koms van die hyreën, Tafelberg, 1994
 Koors, Tafelberg, 1997
 Brandoffer: vertellings uit die Tweede Vryheidsoorlog, Tafelberg, 1998
 Die aarde waarop ek loop, Lapa, 2003
 Kroniek van Turf, Protea Boekhuis, 2017

Drama (stage, television and radio) 
 Kwart voor dagbreek: 'n verhoogspel in drie bedrywe, Afrikaanse Pers Boekhandel, 1961
 Die paddas: satiriese eenakter, Dalro, 1968
 Kamer 99, Perskor, 1972
 Die nagloper: twee tekste vir televisie, Human & Rousseau, 1976
 Niemand se dag nie, Perskor, 1982

Youth literature 
 Skrik kom huis toe''' Nasionale Boekhandel, 1968
 Karel Kousop, Tafelberg, 1985
 Die haasvanger, Tafelberg, 1985

 Poetry 
 Karoosange, Tafelberg, 1975
 Dubbelster, Tafelberg, 1996
 Nag op 'n kaal plein, Human & Rousseau, 2006
 Lang reis na Ithaka, Protea Boekhuis, 2009
 Bleek planet, Protea Boekhuis, 2013
 Portrette in my gang'', Protea Boekhuis, 2015

References

External links

1929 births
2022 deaths
South African writers
Afrikaner people
People from Kopanong Local Municipality